The Hanna Community Hall, also known as Linden Hall and presently used as the Hanna Basin Museum, was built in 1890 in Hanna, Wyoming as a saloon by its proprietor  John Linden to serve coal miners in the area. In 1981 he moved the saloon into the center of Hanna with the Union Pacific Coal Company's permission. When Prohibition was established it became a pool hall, operated by John Thomas After Thomas' accidental death in the 1920s it became the small town's community center. It was  renovated in 1931 with company funding. The community hall is now the Hanna Basin Museum.

Located at the center of the town, it is a one-story frame structure covered in wood clapboards, with a hipped shingle roof. Two uneven extensions to the rear end in gables. Windows are double-hung 8-over-8 units. A small bracketed canopy with arched trim covers the main entrance.

The Hanna Community Hall was listed on the National Register of Historic Places on November 26, 1983.

References

External links
 Hanna Basin Museum website
 Hanna Community Hall at the Wyoming State Historic Preservation Office

National Register of Historic Places in Carbon County, Wyoming
Buildings and structures completed in 1890
Museums in Carbon County, Wyoming